Cessianus (ca. 295 - 303) is a Roman Catholic saint and martyr. At the age of eight, he was martyred during the persecutions of the Roman emperor Diocletian in 303.

History
Pope Gregory XVI presented Bishop Mathias Loras with the remains of Cessianus in 1838. Loras brought the remains with him to the United States. The remains were placed within a side altar in the new St. Raphael's Cathedral, in Dubuque, Iowa.

After renovations carried out in the mid-1980s were completed, it was decided to place the remains of Cessianus under the new, freestanding main altar. On November 23, 1986, the wooden box containing the remains of Cessianus was installed during Mass in the altar where they currently reside.

References

295 births
303 deaths
3rd-century Romans
4th-century Christian martyrs
4th-century Romans
Christian child saints
Italian Roman Catholic saints
Christians martyred during the reign of Diocletian